Nina Popova (October 20, 1922 – August 7, 2020) was a Russian-born American ballet dancer.

Biography
Popova was born in Novorossiysk, Russia. Her family left for Paris shortly after her birth. She studied ballet with other Russian émigrés and, as a teenager, performed with Lyubov Yegorova's Ballet de la Jeunesse. In the late 1930s she performed with the Original Ballet Russe in Australia and Cuba. In 1939, she joined the Ballet Theatre, now called the American Ballet Theatre, in New York. Popova danced with the Ballet Russe de Monte Carlo from 1943 to 1945. She performed on the television program Your Show of Shows and on Broadway.
 
From 1954 to 1967, Popova taught at New York's High School of Performing Arts. From 1967 to 1975 she was the Artistic Director of the Houston Ballet, where she established a professional dance company. 

Popova died from COVID-19 complications in St. Augustine, Florida, during the COVID-19 pandemic in Florida.

References

1922 births
2020 deaths
Houston Ballet
People from Novorossiysk
American Ballet Theatre dancers
Ballet Russe de Monte Carlo dancers
Soviet emigrants to France
Deaths from the COVID-19 pandemic in Florida
French emigrants to the United States